Eremopyrum is a genus Eurasian and North African plants in the grass family. One species, Eremopyrum triticeum has become widely established as a weed in parts of North America.

All the species are annuals with a dense, 2-sided, spikelike inflorescence having 1 spikelet per node.

 Species
 Eremopyrum bonaepartis (Spreng.) Nevski - Algeria, Morocco, Middle East, Arabian Peninsula, Central Asia, Iran, Pakistan, Xinjiang
 Eremopyrum distans (K.Koch) Nevski - European Russia, Caucasus, Middle East, Arabian Peninsula, Central Asia, Iran, Pakistan, Xinjiang, Mongolia
 Eremopyrum orientale (L.) Jaub. & Spach - Algeria, Morocco, Tunisia, Romania, Ukraine, Crimea, European Russia, Caucasus, Middle East, Central Asia, Iran, Pakistan, Xinjiang, Tibet, Inner Mongolia
 Eremopyrum triticeum (Gaertn.) Nevski - Romania, Ukraine, Crimea, European Russia, Caucasus, Turkey, Central Asia, Iran, Xinjiang, Inner Mongolia

 formerly included
see Agropyron Australopyrum Crithopsis Elymus Heteranthelium

References

External links
 Grassbase - The World Online Grass Flora

Pooideae
Poaceae genera
Grasses of Africa
Grasses of Asia
Grasses of Europe
Grasses of Russia